RAF Santacruz was a Royal Air Force airfield in Bombay (now called Mumbai), then British India which saw extensive use in World War II.

History 
The Airfield was constructed in the 1930s when the nearby Juhu Aerodrome, located close by, could not cope with the fighters, bombers and other large transport planes of the Air Force, that required longer and stronger runways. The Santacruz Airfield covered an area of about 1,500 acres (607 hectares). It had three runways originally and built as a standard Class A airfield, the main feature of which was a set of three intersecting concrete runways placed in a triangular pattern. After the end of the War, the airport was handed over to the Director General of Civil Aviation for Civil operations and continues civilian operations.

Squadrons

Numerous Fighter Squadrons and support units were stationed at Santacruz from 1942 to 1947.

Current use

It is now part of the Chhatrapati Shivaji Maharaj International Airport.

References

Airports in Maharashtra
Airports in Mumbai
Royal Air Force stations in Asia
Royal Air Force stations of World War II in Asia
World War II sites in India
1930 establishments in British India